Rochdale is a large town in Greater Manchester, England.

Rochdale may also refer to:

Places

Geography
Metropolitan Borough of Rochdale, a metropolitan borough of Greater Manchester in North West England which includes Rochdale, as well as other settlements
Rochdale (ancient parish), an ancient parish centred on the town of Rochdale
Rochdale (UK Parliament constituency), a parliamentary constituency represented in the House of Commons of the Parliament of the United Kingdom
Rochdale Village, a housing cooperative and neighborhood in the southeastern corner of the New York City borough of Queens.

Housing developments and higher education institutions
Rochdale College, a centre of the 1960s-70s youth counter culture in Toronto, Canada
Rochdale Sixth Form College, Rochdale, England, UK
Rochdale Village, UCB, Berkeley, California, USA

Sports
Rochdale A.F.C., a football club
Rochdale Hornets, an English rugby league club

Transport
Rochdale (car), a make of car. The firm took its name from the town and produced kit cars
Rochdale One, a former cruise ship used as housing for students in Amsterdam between 2004 and 2013
Rochdale, a troop ship, one of the two in the Sinking of the Rochdale and the Prince of Wales in 1807

Other uses
The Rochdale Principles, provide the basis for the principles of cooperation in use by cooperatives around the world
The Rochdale Society of Equitable Pioneers, a group of weavers who designed the Rochdale Principles